Cercidocerus is a genus of the family Curculionidae.

Species
 Cercidocerus albicollis
 Cercidocerus bimaculatus
 Cercidocerus bipunctatus
 Cercidocerus birmanicus
 Cercidocerus bisulcatus
 Cercidocerus carinensis
 Cercidocerus carinicollis
 Cercidocerus chevrolati
 Cercidocerus curvaturatus
 Cercidocerus distinctus
 Cercidocerus dohertyi
 Cercidocerus effetus
 Cercidocerus erubescens
 Cercidocerus erythroceus
 Cercidocerus eximius
 Cercidocerus fabricator
 Cercidocerus fabrilis
 Cercidocerus flavopictus
 Cercidocerus flavopunctatus
 Cercidocerus flavopunctulatus
 Cercidocerus funebris
 Cercidocerus hematopterus
 Cercidocerus heros
 Cercidocerus hispidulus
 Cercidocerus hypocrita
 Cercidocerus incertus
 Cercidocerus indicator
 Cercidocerus infernalis
 Cercidocerus interruptolineatus
 Cercidocerus lateralis
 Cercidocerus nervosus
 Cercidocerus niger
 Cercidocerus nigrolateralis
 Cercidocerus paraprodioctoides
 Cercidocerus pendleburyi
 Cercidocerus pictus
 Cercidocerus planicollis
 Cercidocerus prodioctoides
 Cercidocerus pygmaeus
 Cercidocerus rubromaculatus
 Cercidocerus rufipes
 Cercidocerus sanguinipes
 Cercidocerus saturatus
 Cercidocerus schoenherri
 Cercidocerus schonherri
 Cercidocerus securifer
 Cercidocerus securiferus
 Cercidocerus similis
 Cercidocerus sulcicollis
 Cercidocerus sutura-alba
 Cercidocerus trichopygus
 Cercidocerus viduus
 Cercidocerus x-rubrum

References 

 Bisby F.A., Roskov Y.R., Orrell T.M., Nicolson D., Paglinawan L.E., Bailly N., Kirk P.M., Bourgoin T., Baillargeon G., Ouvrard D. (red.) (2011). http://www.catalogueoflife.org/annual-checklist/2011/search/all/key/cercidocerus/match/1 Catalogue of Life
 Wtaxa

Dryophthorinae